The Hon. Charles Spencer Bateman-Hanbury-Kincaid-Lennox (1827 – 22 March 1912), known as Charles Bateman-Hanbury until 1862, was a British Conservative Party politician.

Background
Born Charles Bateman-Hanbury, he was a younger son of William Bateman-Hanbury, 1st Baron Bateman, and Elizabeth, daughter of Lord Spencer Chichester (son of Arthur Chichester, 1st Marquess of Donegall). William Bateman-Hanbury, 2nd Baron Bateman, was his elder brother.

Political career
Bateman-Hanbury-Kincaid-Lennox sat as member of parliament for Herefordshire from 1852 to 1857 and for Leominster from 1858 to 1865.

Personal life
Bateman-Hanbury-Kincaid-Lennox married Margaret, eldest daughter and co-heir of John Kincaid-Lennox and widow of George Smythe, 7th Viscount Strangford. In 1862 he and his wife assumed by Royal licence the additional surnames of Kincaid-Lennox in accordance with his father-in-law's will.

On 19 August 1893 he married Rosa Cunningham.

References

 London Gazette

External links 
 

1827 births
1912 deaths
Conservative Party (UK) MPs for English constituencies
UK MPs 1852–1857
UK MPs 1857–1859
UK MPs 1859–1865
Younger sons of barons